Kandikonda (13 October 1973 – 12 March 2022) was an Indian film lyricist, known for his works in Telugu cinema. Kandikonda was born in Nagurlapally, Narsampet Mandal of Warangal district. He was awarded Doctorate for his thesis on Situational songs in Telugu cinema from Osmania University.

Career
Kandikonda penned lyrics for over a hundred films in Telugu and private albums as a lyricist. During his initial days he worked for many private and spiritual albums with Music Director Chakri. His vested interest in Chalam's literature made his career inclined towards penning songs as lyricist in Telugu film industry. While working with Chakri, he made his debut into the industry with Malli Kuyave Guvva for  Puri Jagannadh's Itlu Sravani Subramanyam. Thereafter he worked as a lyricist for many songs like Chupulatho Gucchi Gucchi, Gala Gala Paruthuna and many more. He also wrote a song named Maagani Matti Merupu on the journey towards Telangana statehood. In 2019 he wrote a song Bhogimantalu, Sankrantulu, Kanuma Poojalu Saradalu which is based on the festival Sankranti. In 2018 he wrote a song on K. T. Rama Rao's birthday Vachadu Vachadu Oka Leader.

Personal life and death
Kandikonda was a native of Nagurlapally. He died in Hyderabad on 12 March 2022, at the age of 48. He had been battling throat cancer for the two prior years.

Discography

References

External links

1973 births
2022 deaths
People from Telangana
Telugu-language lyricists
Indian male songwriters
Telugu people
Indian lyricists
Deaths from cancer in India